Paradiso Homecoming Tour is a concert tour by New Zealand classical crossover singer Hayley Westenra. 

To promote the 5th international studio album and spread love messages from Paradiso, New Zealands biggest selling artist of all time, Westenra embarked the Paradiso Homecoming Tour, a tour of UK, New Zealand, the east of Asia.

During the New Zealand homecoming tour, Westenra would perform with guest artist Sir Edmund Hillary-Scholar Chase Douglas and would raise charity attention to her UNICEF Goodwill Ambassador appeal and the Christchurch Earthquake Relief fund to support revival of Christchurch.

Tour dates

References

2011 concert tours
2012 concert tours